River Greta may refer to:
River Greta, Cumbria, England
River Greta, Durham, England
River Greta (Lune), England
Greta River, New Zealand